Chen Guanfeng (born 5 February 2000) is a Chinese track and field sprinter. He represented his country at the 2022 World Athletics Championships where he competed in the Men's 4 × 100 metres relay event.

Statistics
Information from World Athletics profile unless otherwise noted.

Personal bests

International competition results

National competition results

References

External links

Living people
2000 births
Chinese male sprinters
World Athletics Championships athletes for China